Maandheere (sometimes written Maandere or Maandeere) is a village in the Middle Shabelle region of Somalia, near Jowhar. 

A February, 2005 report from UNICEF noted that the local school had low enrollment, little space for expansion and poor ventilation.

References 
 UNICEF Somalia Monthly Review Feb 2005
 Maandheere: Somalia

Geography of Somalia